The Mountain Moves is the debut album from English folk rock band Treetop Flyers. It was released in June 2013 under Partisan Records.

Track list

References

2013 debut albums
Partisan Records albums